Giorgio Vismara (born 11 January 1965) is an Italian judoka. He competed in the men's middleweight event at the 1992 Summer Olympics.

References

1965 births
Living people
Italian male judoka
Olympic judoka of Italy
Judoka at the 1992 Summer Olympics
Sportspeople from Milan
Competitors at the 1986 Goodwill Games